United Nations Information Centres (UNIC) is an organization which was established in 1946. Its headquarters is situated at New York, USA, and it currently works worldwide in 63 countries. These centres are managed by the United Nations to exchange & provide current happenings to the world. They are directed by the Department of Global Communications of the UN Secretariat to communicate problems related to the Organization. All development projects are reviewed and approved by DGC. These projects are thematic promotional campaigns of the issues related to UN and publicized through the regional information centres.

History 
In 1946, United Nations Information Centres has been established by the Department of Global Communications. DGC is the organization which works for the people of the United Nations. The motive behind UNICs is to collaborate & exchange information through its centers to the people of the world. The first two United Nations Information Centers were created in 1946. Currently, they have been servicing in 63 countries. These centers are the main hub for exchanging information about the system of the United Nations for all countries where UNICs are presented.

Scope 
United Nations Information Centres have been established in the regions of Europe, Americas, UAE, Asia & Pacific, and Africa. These centres are organized to reduce the communication gaps by providing information of United Nations to the people of the world. To make it more communicable all information have been translated and presented respectively in their regional languages. These centres are otherwise called United Nations Regional Information Centres and responsible for connecting United Nations with the people of developing countries. They reach out media, institutions with coordinating the UN system and get allianced with Government, Non-government, and private sector organizations in their projects. UNICs also maintain physical & digital resources of information like libraries and electronic information medium.

Activities 
UNICs are engaged in multiple cores of activities for sharing the latest information about UN system.

 Communication - UNICs follow communication strategies through the current affairs, traditional festivals, and events. They get information translated into regional languages of the countries they serve.
 Media Outreach - United Nations get connected with national & regional media houses to circulate information. These centres use press conference, print media, electronic and digital medium to collaborate information.
 Information Resource Development - These centres create & maintain resources like libraries, and websites through regional information centres. UNICs activities cover training sessions for journalist to keep them update with its development projects. They regularly conduct television and radio for broadcasting stories of UN in regional languages.
 Events Organization - These centres organize many events on international & national celebration days. Besides, they manage to arrange seminars, sports & other competitions in educational institutions.

List of centres 
The following are all of the current information centres, as well as all the areas they serve:

African States

American States

Arab States

Asia and Pacific States

Europe and the Commonwealth of Independent States

References

External links
 United Nations Information Centres Website
 United Nations 
 United Nations Information Centre Washington

Organizations established by the United Nations